House at 474 Ocean Avenue, also known as Luning House, is a historic home located at Lynbrook in Nassau County, New York. It was built about 1838 and is a two-story, frame Greek Revival style dwelling.  It consists of a large three-bay center section with a two-story, two-bay wing.  A single height porch runs the length of the house and has square support posts with distinctive scroll brackets.  Also on the property is a contributing well house.

It was listed on the National Register of Historic Places in 2008.

References

Houses on the National Register of Historic Places in New York (state)
Greek Revival houses in New York (state)
Houses completed in 1838
Houses in Nassau County, New York
National Register of Historic Places in Nassau County, New York